Personal may refer to:

Aspects of persons' respective individualities 
 Privacy
 Personality
 Personal, personal advertisement, variety of classified advertisement used to find romance or friendship

Companies
 Personal, Inc., a Washington, D.C.-based tech startup
 The Personal, a Canadian-based group car insurance and home insurance company
 Telecom Personal, a mobile phone company in Argentina and Paraguay

Music
 Personal (album), the debut album by R&B group Men of Vizion
 Personal, the first album from singer-songwriter Quique González, and the title song
 "Personal" (Aya Ueto song), a 2003 song by Aya Ueto from Message
"Personal" (Hrvy song), a song from Talk to Ya
"Personal" (The Vamps song), a song from Night & Day
"Personal", a song by Kehlani from SweetSexySavage

Books
 Personal (novel), a 2014 novel by Lee Child

See also 
 The Personals (disambiguation)
 Person
 Personality psychology
 Personalization
 Human scale